St. Peter's Square is a plaza located in front of St. Peter's Basilica in the Vatican City.

St. Peter's Square may also refer to:

St Peter's Square, London
St Peter's Square, Manchester, England
St Peter's Square tram stop in Manchester
One St Peter's Square, a high-rise office building in Manchester
Two St Peter's Square, a high-rise office building in Manchester
3 St Peter's Square, a high-rise hotel and aparthotel in Manchester
St. Peter's Square (Fort Wayne, Indiana)

Odonyms referring to religion